Undercurrent is a 1962 album by jazz pianist Bill Evans and jazz guitarist Jim Hall. The two men collaborated again in 1966 on the album Intermodulation.

Cover and releases
The front cover image for Undercurrent is Toni Frissell's photograph "Weeki Wachee Spring, Florida". The album was originally released on United Artists, then reissued by Solid State in 1968. Later, the album was reissued on the Blue Note label; both Blue Note and United Artists Records have been part of the same catalog for many decades. The original LP and the first CD reissue featured a cropped, blue-tinted version, overlaid with the title and the Blue Note logo in white; but for the most recent (24-bit remastered) CD reissue, the image has been restored to its original black-and-white coloration and size, without lettering.

Reception

In his November 26, 1962 review for DownBeat magazine jazz critic Pete Welding states: "This collaboration between Evans and Hall has resulted in some of the most beautiful, thoroughly ingratiating music it has been my pleasure to hear."

Track listing
Original LP
 "My Funny Valentine" (Richard Rodgers, Lorenz Hart) – 5:21
 "I Hear a Rhapsody" (Jack Baker, George Fragos, Dick Gasparre) – 4:36
 "Dream Gypsy" (Judith Veevers)– 4:33
 "Romain" (Jim Hall) – 5:19
 "Skating in Central Park" (John Lewis) – 5:19
 "Darn That Dream" (Eddie DeLange, Jimmy Van Heusen) – 5:04

Bonus tracks on 2002 Blue Note CD reissue:
"Stairway to the Stars"  (Matty Malneck, Mitchell Parish, Frank Signorelli) – 5:38
 "I'm Getting Sentimental Over You" (George Bassman, Ned Washington) – 4:13
 "My Funny Valentine [Alternate Take] – 6:54
 "Romain" [Alternate Take] – 5:24

Recorded on April 24 (#2, 7, 8) and May 14 (all others), 1962.

Personnel
Bill Evans – piano
Jim Hall – guitar

References

External links
Jazz Discography entries for Bill Evans
Bill Evans Memorial Library discography

1962 albums
Bill Evans albums
Albums produced by Alan Douglas (record producer)
Albums produced by Michael Cuscuna
Blue Note Records albums
Jim Hall (musician) albums
Solid State Records (jazz label) albums
Collaborative albums